"Try Again" is a song by American contemporary R&B group Champaign. Released in February 1983 as the only single from their album Modern Heart, this ballad rose through the Billboard Hot 100 chart in April and May, peaking at number 23 in mid-June.

Chart history

Personnel
Pauli Carman - lead vocals
Rena (Jones) Day - backing vocals
Leon Reeder - guitar 
Michael Reed - bass
Michael Day - keyboards
Dana Walden - keyboards
Rocky Maffitt - drums

References

Champaign (band) songs
1983 singles
1983 songs
Columbia Records singles